Rick Dyer is an American Bigfoot enthusiast known for perpetrating hoaxes surrounding the subject. Texas Monthly has called Dyer "the world's most infamous Bigfoot hunter."

Background
Dyer is a full time Bigfoot hunter who is a self-styled "master tracker" of Bigfoot. Dyer and his hoaxes have appeared in Time, Discovery News, Fox News Channel, The Huffington Post and CNN.

2008 hoax
On August 12, 2008, Matthew Whitton and Dyer released a press release and went on Steve Kulls' radio show Squatch Detective to announce they had a dead Bigfoot body in their possession.  After initially leaking grainy footage that showed Bigfoot, they presented the carcass encased in a block of ice at a conference that was only open to the press. The two announced that they found the 7-foot-7-inch, 500-lbs creature while hiking in the north Georgia mountains in June. They also stated that they had spotted about three other similar creatures after making the discovery. According to Dyer, it took them a day and a half with six men to carry out the Bigfoot, all the while being followed by other Bigfoot creatures. Tom Biscardi joined Whitton and Dyer for the news conference, stating "Last weekend, I touched it, I measured its feet, I felt its intestines" and lauded its authenticity. As it thawed, however, the claim began to "unravel as a giant hoax."

Jerry Parrino, owner of internet Halloween costumer retailer TheHorrorDome.com, said that the costume "definitely looks like our costume" after viewing photos of Dyer's "Bigfoot". Upon further inspection, it was confirmed that the "corpse" was in fact a costume stuffed with opossum roadkill, entrails and slaughterhouse leftovers.

National Geographic called the hoax a "short lived one", as the whole affair lasted only a few days.

Upon being exposed, Dyer said that an unnamed government agency confiscated the real Bigfoot body, and, believing that he needed to produce something, fabricated the hoax.

2012 hoax
In 2012, Dyer claimed to have killed a Bigfoot-like creature in San Antonio, Texas, in early September. According to Dyer, he lured the Bigfoot out using "pork ribs from Wal-Mart" doused in a special barbecue sauce that he attached to trees. Of the experience, he told Esquire magazine, "We nailed 'em all around the trees, and then that night we heard Bigfoot come back. I chased him down in the middle of the night. I shot him once, he ran, I shot him again."

He claimed that an unnamed university in Washington state had tested the creature's DNA and told Dyer that it was an unknown species. Dyer's accomplice and self-proclaimed bigfoot skeptic, Allen Issleb ("Musky Allen") of Wauconda, Illinois, claimed to have inspected Dyer's bigfoot in Las Vegas in February 2013 and proclaimed it to be the real thing. This claim resulted in many people getting sucked into Dyer's scam. Dyer called the creature Hank and started touring the body around the United States, charging people to view it. To view the body, which lay beneath Plexiglas in a wooden coffin, adults were charged $10 and children were charged $5. The sold-out tour eventually pulled in close to $500,000.

Of the creature, Dyer stated "DNA, DNA sequencing, scans, autopsy, everything you can imagine it was being done." Some in the media endorsed Dyer, including Andrew Clacy.

Critics soon pointed out that Dyer had pulled off a Bigfoot hoax in 2008, and called for Dyer to release more open testing. Throughout the course of the hoax, Dyer repeatedly slandered anyone who openly spoke up about him. Many suggested this tactic was just more proof that Dyer was hoaxing again.

Professor Don Jeffrey Meldrum at the Department of Anthropology at Idaho State University stated "The thing has clearly been fabricated to depict a specimen that has been dissected. It smacks of images of alien autopsy." Responding to the controversy, team members working with Dyer on the touring and Bigfoot projects overall confronted Dyer. Andrew Clacy, a spokesperson for the project, wrote "I confronted Mr. Dyer in Daytona on my suspicions of authenticity, and he admitted to me personally that the body of 'Hank' was not a real body, but rather a construct of a company from Washington State which was paid for by Rick Dyer. I am available and willing to cooperate with any Federal or State law enforcement investigations should they arise." Clacy immediately flew back to Australia and abandoned both the project and Dyer.

With his crew leaving, Dyer announced on his Facebook page that Hank was indeed a fake. Chris Russell of Twisted Toy Box in Washington admitted he had manufactured Hank at Dyer's request, using latex, foam and camel hair. Dyer had told Russell the prop was for a movie about killing Bigfoot that he was shooting and that he also wanted a baby Bigfoot and female to be created. Russell started receiving threatening phone calls, emails and other contact for making the prop and so decided against making the rest of the Bigfoot family. Russell stated "I was asked to make the prop look like a poorly made, old and rotten taxidermy prop that had not been preserved correctly. Dyer did send photos and drawings taken from the Internet and asked for certain features to be replicated."

Dyer maintains that he actually does have the body of a real Bigfoot that he shot and killed, but cannot produce it.

Aftermath
On his Facebook page, Dyer posted "From this moment on, I will speak the truth! No more lies, tall tales or wild goose chases to mess with the haters. I never treated anyone bad, I'm a joker, I play around, that's just me. Coming clean about everything is necessary for a new start. From this moment own  I will speak the truth! No more lies, tall tales or wild goose chases to mess with the haters!" in March, 2014.

Benjamin Radford, deputy editor of skeptic magazine Skeptical Inquirer, stated "If Bigfoot researchers wish to be taken seriously, they could start by cleaning their own house. The biggest threat to their credibility is not skeptics nor a ridiculing public but instead those who provide an endless stream of bogus claims and evidence."

In 2013 Dyer was one of four Bigfoot hunters who participated in the documentary Shooting Bigfoot: America's Monster Hunters.

References

Bigfoot
Hoaxers
Living people
Place of birth missing (living people)
Year of birth missing (living people)